Hae Geumwa was the second ruler (48–7 BCE) of Dongbuyeo (East Buyeo), an ancient kingdom of Korea. His story is recorded in Samguk Sagi, Samguk Yusa and Book of King Dongmyeong.

Birth and background 
Geumwa (金蛙 or 金蝸) was the son of Hae Buru, who was the king of Dongbuyeo. According to the Samgukyusa, Hae Buru was old and without an heir, when he found a gold-colored frog-like (or a gold-colored snail-like) child under a large rock near Lake Gonyeon. Hae Buru named the child Geumwa, meaning golden frog (or golden snail), and later made him crown prince.

Hae Buru established Dongbuyeo when he moved the capital east to Gaseopwon by the Sea of Japan (East Sea).

Reign

Jumong's departure 
Geumwa became king after Hae Buru's death. At Ubal river, south of Mount Taebaek, Geumwa met Lady Yuhwa, the disowned daughter of Habaek, the god of the Amnok River or, according to an alternative interpretation, the sun god Haebak, and brought her back to his palace. She was impregnated by sunlight and conceived Jumong. 

Geumwa's two sons resented Jumong, and so did he. He attempted numerous times to destroy Jumong when he was a teen, but later gave up, as the boy was indestructible. Jumong later ran away to Jolbon, or former Bukbuyeo, where he later established Goguryeo.

Mother of Goguryeo 
Lady Yuhwa, Jumong's mother, died. Geumwa gave her the burial of a Queen Mother (Queen Mother of Goguryeo), despite the fact that she had never been a queen. Jumong sent numerous gifts to Geumwa in gratitude of caring for his mother, and peace was seemingly restored between the two kingdoms.

Death 
Geumwa died, and the throne was passed to his eldest son Daeso. King Daeso attacked Goguryeo during the reign of its second ruler, King Yuri. Goguryeo's third ruler King Daemusin attacked Dongbuyeo and killed Daeso. After internal strife, Dongbuyeo fell, and its territory was absorbed into Goguryeo.

Popular culture 
 Portrayed by Jun Kwang-ryul in the 2006-2007 MBC TV series Jumong.

References

See also 
 Jumong
 Hae Buru
 Dongbuyeo
 List of Korean monarchs
 History of Korea

History of Korea
7 BC deaths
Buyeo rulers
1st-century BC rulers in Asia
Year of birth unknown
1st-century BC Korean people